John Nash Round (1817 – 30 October 1864) was an English Victorian ecclesiastical architect active in the mid-nineteenth-century Kent, England. He worked with architect Edwin Nash) on St. John the Evangelist, Penge (1850); thereafter Edwin Nash worked alone. His name is typically recorded as "J. N. Round."

Round was born in Lambeth, the son of William Nash Round and Jane Pryer Round.

Works
St. John the Evangelist, Penge (1849–1850, with Edwin Nash). Without Round, Edwin Nash added subsequent work to the church, including the gabled aisles in 1861, and the transepts in 1866.

References

Date of birth missing
1817 births
1864 deaths
English ecclesiastical architects
Architects from Kent
19th-century English architects